Colin Fewer (born June 15, 1977) is a Canadian road running athlete competing in various long-distance events. He has represented Canada nationally on a number of occasions. Fewer frequently travels to road running events in other parts of Canada, and around the world. In 2019, he set a new record for Tely 10 wins (12), and beat Pat Kelly's previously held record of 9. Colin is currently sponsored by the Running Room, and he has been sponsored by Saucony in the  past. Fewer is currently a gym teacher at Mary Queen Of Peace Elementary School.

References

1977 births
Living people
Canadian male long-distance runners
Sportspeople from St. John's, Newfoundland and Labrador
World record holders in athletics (track and field)